Magrath Ó Fionnachta (died 1361) was an Irish musician.

Ó Fionnachta was a member of one of several families that claimed descent from the Síol Muireadhaigh dynasty of the Ui Briuin of Connacht. They generally resided along the banks of the River Suck, on the border of what is now County Roscommon and County Galway.

Under the year 1361, The Annals of the Four Masters preserve his obituary:

Magrath Ó Fionnachta, Chief Musician and Tiompanist to the Sil-Murray, died.

The instrument he played was an tiompan Gàidhealach, not the timpani.

The surname is now generally rendered as Finnerty.

References
 Ann Buckley, "What was the Tiompán? A problem in ethnohistorical organology. Evidence in Irish literature", p. 53–88, Jahrbuch fur Musikalische Volks – un Volkerkunde, ix, 1978.
 Ann Buckley, "Timpán/Tiompán", in The New Grove Dictionary of Musical Instruments, London, 1986
 Ann Buckley, "Musical instruments in Ireland 9th 14th centuries: A review of the organological evidence", pp. 13–57, Irish Musical Studies i, Blackrock, County Dublin, 1990
 Ann Buckley, "Music and musicians in medieval Irish society", pp. 165–190, Early Music xxviii, no.2, May 2000
 Ann Buckley, "Music in Prehistoric and Medieval Ireland", pp. 744–813, in A New History of Ireland, volume one, Oxford, 2005.

Year of birth unknown
1361 deaths
Medieval Gaels from Ireland
14th-century Irish musicians
Musicians from County Galway
Musicians from County Roscommon
Irish hammered dulcimer players